Laurie Fortier (born ) is an American actress. She is known for her television work on Running the Halls, Push and Hemlock Grove, and for her film work in To Gillian on Her 37th Birthday and The In Crowd.

Career
Fortier made her debut in the NBC teen comedy series Running the Halls in 1993, playing Holiday Friedman, one of the lead roles. In 1998, she was one of the leads on ABC's short-lived drama/soap opera Push, playing gymnast and Olympic hopeful Cara Bradford.

Fortier appeared in the film To Gillian on Her 37th Birthday in 1996, playing the role of Cindy, the flirtatious best friend of Claire Danes' character. In 2000, she appeared in the comedy film Dean Quixote as Annie. The same year, Fortier also appeared in the thriller film The In Crowd playing the role of Kelly who has a crush on the lead character, Brittany, played by Susan Ward; Fortier's portrayal elicited mildly positive notice from The New York Times reviewer Elvis Mitchell.

In 2013, Fortier joined the cast of the Netflix supernatural drama Hemlock Grove, playing the role of Marie Godfrey, one of the series' mortal characters.

Personal life
Fortier was born and raised  in Pasadena, California. She is of Italian descent. She was selected to be a Rose Princess in the 103rd Tournament of Roses Parade, which took place on January 1, 1992. She briefly studied at Saint Mary's College in Moraga, California, before moving to Los Angeles to pursue her acting career. Fortier is married to director Deran Sarafian, and they have two children together.

Filmography

References

External links
 

Living people
1974 births
American television actresses
Actresses from California
People from Pasadena, California
21st-century American women